Agios Ilias (Saint Elias) may refer to the following places in Greece and Cyprus:

 Agios Ilias, Amaliada, a village in the municipality of Amaliada, northern Elis
 Agios Ilias, Cyprus, a village in Famagusta District, Cyprus
 Agios Ilias, Lefkada, a village on the island of Lefkada
 Agios Ilias, Pyrgos, a village in the municipality of Pyrgos, central Elis
 Agios Ilias, Zacharo, a village in the municipality of Zacharo, southern Elis
 Agios Ilias, a subdivision of Aitoliko

See also  
 Ilias (disambiguation)
 Saint Elias (disambiguation)